Nicholas Joseph Clayton (November 1, 1840 in Cloyne, County Cork – December 9, 1916) was a prominent Victorian era architect in Galveston, Texas. Clayton constructed many grand religious and public buildings in Galveston including the First Presbyterian Church (Galveston, Texas). He is also credited as the architect of Sacred Heart Catholic Church (Tampa, Florida) and of the Main Building of St. Edward's University in Austin, Texas. He also designed an addition to St. Mary Cathedral in Galveston.

Works

Gallery

References

Further reading

External links

 
 Photos of Clayton's work

19th-century Irish people
1840 births
1916 deaths
Irish architects
19th-century American architects
People from Galveston, Texas
Architects of Roman Catholic churches
20th-century American architects
Architects from Texas
People from County Cork
Irish emigrants to the United States (before 1923)
Catholics from Texas